Henri Kellen (7 April 1927 – 27 August 1950) was a Luxembourgian cyclist. He competed in the individual and team road race events at the 1948 Summer Olympics.

References

External links
 

1927 births
1950 deaths
Luxembourgian male cyclists
Olympic cyclists of Luxembourg
Cyclists at the 1948 Summer Olympics
People from Capellen (canton)